Karl Theodor Hartweg (18 June 1812 – 3 February 1871) was a German botanist. He collected numerous new species of plants in Colombia, Ecuador, Guatemala, Mexico and California in the United States, collecting for the London Horticultural Society. Many of the species he discovered were formally published, with attribution, by George Gordon, the Foreman of the London Horticultural Society Gardens and a specialist in the conifers which were well represented in Hartweg's collections.

Many plants collected in Mexico by Hartweg from 1836 onward were identified and catalogued by George Bentham in Plantas Hartwegianas.

References

External links
Plantas Hartwegianas

1812 births
1871 deaths
Botanists active in North America
Botanists active in Central America
Botanists active in South America
Botanists with author abbreviations
19th-century German botanists